SF Film may refer to:

 SF Film (Danish company), a Danish film distributor, e.g. The Journals of Knud Rasmussen
 SF Film Finland, a Finnish film distributor
 SF Studios, a Swedish film production company
 Science fiction film